Sympycnodes digitata is a species of moth of the family Cossidae. It is found in Australia, where it has been recorded along the eastern coast and tablelands from the Queensland to Victoria. The habitat consists of wet sclerophyll forests.

The wingspan is 18–38 mm for males and 34–51 mm for females. The forewings are light fuscous with two dark brown spots surrounded by white scales. Adults have been recorded on wing from mid-November to the end of February.

Etymology
The species name refers to the finger-like projection of the saccus in the male genitalia and is derived from digitata (meaning with a finger).

References

Moths described in 2012
Zeuzerinae